High Tide is a 1987 Australian drama film starring Judy Davis, from a script by Laura Jones, about the mother-daughter bond, directed by Gillian Armstrong. Armstrong reported that when she began work on High Tide she pinned a note above her desk: "Blood ties. Water. Running Away."  Jan Adele plays Lilli's mother-in-law Bet, in her film debut.

Synopsis
Lilli is one of three backing singers for a touring Elvis impersonator until she is fired. Then, left alone at the beginning of winter she is stranded in a ramshackle beach town on the windswept coast of New South Wales. This remote, working class, tourist-town has a pervasive sense of rootlessness and movement. The people survive by changing their occupations with the seasons and work hard in small businesses.  Here, stuck in the Mermaid Caravan Park, she encounters her teenage daughter Ally (Claudia Karvan). When Lilli's young surfer husband had died, she felt lost; she gave up her baby to her mother-in-law, Bet. Lilli has been drifting ever since, and getting wasted. Bet is a rowdy, belligerent woman, devoted to Ally—she has taken care of her for 13 years but she has no idea how unhappy the girl is. Lilli has an immediate rapport with the lonely Ally even before she knows that Ally is her daughter, and after she knows, she cannot take her eyes off her.  They belong with each other. but Lilli's terrified of taking on the responsibilities of motherhood, and Bet tells her she is riff-raff. When Ally is first seen, she is in the water; surfing is—"her refuge from the noisy junkiness of life with Bet. Bet isn't a monster, she's simply the wrong person to be raising the pensive Ally, whose emotions are hidden away, like her mother's. The drama is in our feeling that Lilli must not leave her daughter in the embrace of this raucous old trouper."

Cast
Judy Davis as Lillie
Jan Adele as Bet
Claudia Karvan as Ally
Frankie J. Holden as Lester
John Clayton as Col
Colin Friels as Mick
Toni Scanlan as Mary
Monica Trapaga as Tracey
Barry Rugless as Club manager
Bob Purtell as Joe

Production
The story was developed by Armstong, Sandra Levy and writer Laura Jones. They wanted to make something contemporary that had a small cast and would be relatively cheap to make.

The script was originally written and financed to be about a man who had abandoned his daughter. But then Armstrong went to see Wrong World at the cinema, which was about a male drifter, and the more she thought about the more she felt there had been plenty of films about a man being reunited with their child such as Paper Moon and Paris Texas. Her husband suggested she change the character to a woman, which would not only be different but give the film a harder edge. Armstrong was reluctant as she did not want to make another film about a woman, but eventually changed her mind. Jones and Levy agreed with the choice.

Judy Davis was approached even before the film was rewritten and she was involved in further drafts.

In 2021, Claudia Karvan recalled,

Karvan also recalled, "Gillian Armstrong was such a unique voice, and to be working with such extraordinary women, and to have Judy Davis play my mum, it was an absolute one off. She was so smart, so available, so funny, so engaging and she set the bar incredibly high."

Awards
In 1987 the film was nominated for seven AFI Awards (Best Film, Best Director, Best Original Screenplay, Best Actress, Best Supporting Actress x 2, Best Sound) and won in the Best Actress in a Lead Role (Judy Davis) and Best Actress in a Supporting Role (Jan Adele) categories. In 1989 Judy Davis won the NSFC Best Actress award for her role.

Box office
High Tide grossed $206,185 at the box office in Australia, which is equivalent to $414,432 in 2009 dollars.

See also
Cinema of Australia

References

Further reading

External links

High Tide at the NFSA

1987 films
Australian drama films
1987 drama films
Films set in New South Wales
Films about mother–daughter relationships
1980s English-language films